Mämmi is a traditional Finnish dessert, eaten around Easter.

Mämmi is traditionally made of water, rye flour, powdered malted rye, seasoned salt and dried, powdered Seville orange zest. The mixture is then left to sweeten naturally, before being baked in an oven until set, by which time the colour and flavour has developed due to the Maillard reaction. After baking, the mämmi is chilled for three to four days before serving. Unlike traditional mämmi, which is left to sweeten naturally, commercially made mämmi is usually seasoned with dark molasses. Traditional mämmi has an aromatic and sweet flavour, consisting of just 2% sugar or less, whereas commercially produced mämmi can contain as much as 20% sugar and is therefore much different in flavour. Mämmi has up to 10% protein and is rich in trace elements. Traditionally, mämmi was stored in small boxes made of birch bark called tuokkonen or rove, the appearance of which is now mimicked by commercial packaging.

Typically, mämmi is eaten cold, with either milk or cream and sugar, and less commonly with vanilla sauce. Traditionally, it was also eaten on sliced bread as a spread. There is a Finnish society for mämmi founded by Ahmed Ladarsi, the former chef at the Italian Embassy in Helsinki, who has developed around fifty recipes containing mämmi. There are a number of websites with recipes using mämmi, most of them Finnish. Mämmi is also used as a minor ingredient in a mämmi beer by Laitilan Wirvoitusjuomatehdas.

History

Mämmi was first mentioned during the 16th century, in a dissertation (in Latin). It is claimed that it has been eaten in southwestern Finland ever since the 13th century. 

Traditionally mämmi is eaten during the Easter season. From 1700s to 1800s mämmi was eaten in sauna as a tradition, but during Russian terror the tradition has slowly faded away. Finnish saying Mämmi is eaten in sauna is one of the only remaining evidences of the old tradition.

Today, Finns seldom make mämmi at home and most modern mämmi is factory-made. Traditional versions of mämmi are sold in Finland with the labels perinteinen (traditional) or luomu (organic). Some people of Finnish descent in North America and Australia still make mämmi at home.

See also

 List of desserts
 Samanu

References

External links

Nutrition of Mämmi (with malt), Sweetened Malt Porridge, Finnish Easter Pudding
Mämmi Maestro. Ahmed Ladarsi is an expert on a Finnish "delicacy"
Mämmi at Easter

Finnish desserts
Easter food
Rye-based dishes
Malt
National dishes
Citrus dishes